Dendrobium crystallinum (shiny crystal dendrobium) is a species of orchid. It is native to Southeast Asia, Hainan and Yunnan in China, and Manipur in India.

References

crystallinum
Flora of Indo-China
Flora of Hainan
Orchids of India
Orchids of Yunnan
Environment of Manipur
Plants described in 1868